Mamman Bello Ali (1958 – 26 January 2009) was Nigerian Senator for Yobe South senatorial district. He was the chairman senate committee on public account from 1999 to 2007, and the Governor of Yobe State from 2007 until his death in 2009. He was a member of the All Nigeria Peoples Party (ANPP). He was receiving medical treatment for leukemia in a Florida hospital when he died.

References

1958 births
2009 deaths
Nigerian Muslims
Governors of Yobe State
Members of the Senate (Nigeria)
All Nigeria Peoples Party politicians
Deaths from leukemia
Deaths from cancer in Florida
20th-century Nigerian politicians
21st-century Nigerian politicians